The 1994 United States Senate election in New York was held November 8, 1994. Incumbent Democratic U.S. Senator Daniel Patrick Moynihan won re-election to a fourth term.

Democratic primary

Candidates 
Daniel Patrick Moynihan, incumbent U.S. Senator
Al Sharpton, civil rights activist, Baptist minister and talk show host

Results

Republican primary

Candidates 
Bernadette Castro, CEO of Castro Convertibles
Henry Hewes, real estate developer and perennial candidate

Results

General election

Candidates 
 Daniel Patrick Moynihan (D), incumbent U.S. Senator
 Bernadette Castro (R), CEO of Castro Convertibles

Campaign 
1994 was significant for the Republican Revolution, mostly as a referendum against President Bill Clinton and his health care plan, and was seen as a tough year for Democratic incumbents.  Moynihan, however, was New York State's most popular politician at the time, and ran ahead of all other Democrats competing statewide.

Republican Castro was running for office for the first time and had trouble raising funds due to being seen as unlikely to win; at times during the race she trailed by up to 30 percentage points.  She portrayed herself as a fiscally conservative, socially moderate Republican in the mold of Governor of New Jersey Christine Todd Whitman, and attempted to portray Moynihan as excessively liberal and prone to government spending.  But Moynihan repeated his past strong performance among upstate voters, in addition to the usual Democratic strongholds in New York City.

Results

See also 
 1994 United States Senate elections

References 

New York
1994
1994 New York (state) elections